Hauturua is an extinct genus of sea snails, marine gastropod mollusks in the family Drilliidae.

Distribution
These extinct species were found in Miocene strata of New Zealand, age range: 12.7 to 11.608 Ma.

Species
Species within the genus Hauturua include:
 † Hauturua bijuga (Marwick, 1931)
 † Hauturua exiguescens (Marwick, 1931) 
 † Hauturua laevella (Marwick, 1931) 
 † Hauturua vellai (Beu, 1970)

References

 Marwick, John. The Tertiary Mollusca of the Gisborne District. Department of Scientific and Industrial Research, Geological Survey Branch, 1931.
 Beu, Alan G. "Descriptions of new species and notes on taxonomy of New Zealand Mollusca." Royal Society of New Zealand, 1970.

External links
 Fossilworks: Hauturua

 
Gastropods of New Zealand
Prehistoric gastropod genera